Osmakov is a rural locality (a khutor) in Alexeyevsky District, Belgorod Oblast, Russia. The population was 154 as of 2010. There are 2 streets.

Geography 
Osmakov is located 42 km southeast of Alexeyevka (the district's administrative centre) by road. Tyutyunikovo is the nearest rural locality.

References 

Rural localities in Alexeyevsky District, Belgorod Oblast
Biryuchensky Uyezd